Global Evisceration is a live video album by the American death metal band Cannibal Corpse, released in 2011.

Track listing
"Evisceration Plague"
"Scattered Remains, Splattered Brains"
"Make Them Suffer"
"Death Walking Terror"
"Devoured by Vermin"
"Priests of Sodom"
"Scalding Hail"
"I Will Kill You"
"Staring Through the Eyes of the Dead"
"Hammer Smashed Face"
"Stripped, Raped, and Strangled"

Bonus
"The Cryptic Stench"
"Disfigured"
"Pit of Zombies"
"Pounded into Dust"
"A Skull Full of Maggots"
"The Wretched Spawn"

Extras
Prepare to Die
The Gas Chamber
Peregrination
Metal Brothers
Eaten Back to Life on the Road
Fan Photos
The Throne Room
Savage Sobriquets
Code Words and Comedy
Rest for the Wicked
Gifts of Gore

Personnel
George "Corpsegrinder" Fisher – vocals
Pat O'Brien – lead guitar
Rob Barrett – rhythm guitar
Alex Webster – bass
Paul Mazurkiewicz – drums

References

Cannibal Corpse video albums
2011 video albums
2011 live albums
Live video albums
Documentary films about heavy metal music and musicians
Metal Blade Records live albums
Metal Blade Records video albums